Zhang Mengqiu (born 9 March 2002) is a Chinese para-alpine skier. She won gold medals in the Super-G and giant slalom events, and silver medals in the downhill, slalom and super combined standing events at the 2022 Winter Paralympics in Beijing, China.

References 

Living people
2002 births
Place of birth missing (living people)
Chinese female alpine skiers
Alpine skiers at the 2022 Winter Paralympics
Medalists at the 2022 Winter Paralympics
Paralympic gold medalists for China
Paralympic silver medalists for China
Paralympic medalists in alpine skiing
21st-century Chinese women